142. Fighter Escadrille was a unit of the Polish Air Force at the start of the Second World War.
The unit was attached to the Pomorze Army.

Equipment

10 PZL P.11c airplanes.

Air Crew

Commanding officer: kpt. pil. Mirosław Leśniewski
Deputy Commander: por. Wacław Wilczewski

Pilots

 por. Jerzy Słoński-Ostoja
 por. rez. Stanisław Zieliński
 ppor. Jan Czapiewski
 ppor. Stanisław Skalski
 ppor. Paweł Zenker
 pchor. Leon Jaugsch
 pchor. Stanisław Kogut
 pchor. Karol Pniak
 kpr. Zygmunt Klein
 kpr. Antoni Łysek
 kpr. Jan Śmigielski
 kpr. Ludwik Weywer
 kpr. Stanisław Wieprzkowicz
 kpr. Mirosław Wojciechowski
 st. szer. Winicjusz Barański
 st. szer. Leon Kosmowski
 st. szer. Zenon Kowalski
 st. szer. Leon Spindel

See also
Polish Air Force order of battle in 1939

References
 

Polish Air Force escadrilles